{{Infobox river
| name              = Pora
| image             = Torrente pora ponte ferroviario a finale ligure.png
| image_caption     =The Pora near its mouth
| length            = <ref name=fin>INTERVENTI PER LA MESSA IN SICUREZZA DEL T. PORA TRA IL PONTE DI VIA SAGITTARIO E LA FOCE, Comune di Finale Ligure, on-line in pdf:  (access: 2015-05-22)</ref>
| source1_elevation = 
| mouth_elevation   = 
| discharge1_avg    = 
| basin_size        = 
| source1_location  = Ligurian Alps
| mouth             = Ligurian Sea
| mouth_location    = Finale Ligure (SV)
| mouth_coordinates = 
| subdivision_type1 = Country
| subdivision_name1 = Italy
| map               = Pora mappa.png
}}

The Pora (or Porra) is a  stream of Liguria (Italy).

 Geography 

The river rises at around 1000 m in the Ligurian Alps, not faraway from Colle del Melogno, at the junction between rio Rivase and Rio Peccione, in the comune of Rialto. Flowing in the Valle Pora it passes through the comune of Calice Ligure, where it receives from left the waters of torrente Carbuta. Heading south-east the Pora reaches Finlaborgo and gets its main tributary, torrente Aquila; a couple of km downstream it ends its course in the Ligurian Sea, after being crossed by the Genoa–Ventimiglia railway and the Aurelia national road.

Pora basin (59 km2) is totally included in the Province of Savona

 Main tributaries 

 Left hand:
 Torrente Carbuta (watershed 6 km2): it comes from Pian dei Corsi and enters the Pora in Calice Ligure;
 Torrente Aquila (watershed 21 km2): from Monte Alto (956 m) in heads South and crosses the comune of Orco Feglino joining the Pora in Finalborgo;
 Right hand:
 Rio Ravin: comes from the SE slopes of Bric Gettina;
 Rio Molino.

See also

 List of rivers of Italy

References

 External links 

  Torrente Pora'' www.fipsas.it (fishing rules for the stream)

Rivers of Italy
Rivers of Liguria
Rivers of the Province of Savona
Rivers of the Alps
Drainage basins of the Ligurian Sea